Justice Valentine may refer to:

Itimous T. Valentine Sr. (1887–1970), associate justice of the North Carolina Supreme Court
Daniel Mulford Valentine (1830–1907), associate justice of the Kansas Supreme Court

See also
 Valentine (disambiguation)